West Lake is an artificial lake in Chao'an District of Chaozhou City, Guangdong Province, China.

History

At that time, the local government built the North Dyke, breaking the link between Hanjiang River and West Lake.

In the Southern Song dynasty (1127–1279), military official Lin Guangshi made a positive contribution to West Lake, especially the Mount Hulu within the lake park. His article Jun Hu Ming has been circulated to the present.

In the Yuan dynasty (1271–1368), most of the temples, pagodas and other halls or pavilions were destroyed in the battle of Chaozhou during the Mongolian invasion of the 13th century. 

In the early Ming dynasty (1368–1644), in order to erect the city wall, the local government filled the a half of West Lake with stones.

In the Qing dynasty (1644–1911), many literati landscapes were devastated by wars between the Qing army and rebel forces.

During the Republic of China, warlord Hong Zhaolin appropriated West Lake as his own garden and named it "Hong Garden".

Tourist attractions
The Hanbi Pavilion was built in 1922. It is a small two floor Western-style building. During the Nanchang Uprising, it was used as the office for Zhou Enlai. Other attractions include Rainbow-shaped Bridge, Mid-Lake Pavilion, Jinghan Pavilion (named after Han Yu), Xinsu Pavilion (named after Su Shi), Wenshan Pavilion (named after Wen Tianxiang), Fishing Platform, and Wild Goose Pagoda.

Gallery

References

Lakes of Guangdong
Tourist attractions in Chaozhou
Parks in Chaozhou